Bilel Aouacheria (born 2 April 1994) is a French footballer who plays as a winger for Gil Vicente.

He spent his professional career in Portugal, where he made over 100 Primeira Liga appearances for Moreirense, Farense and Gil Vicente. He also achieved a century of appearances in the second tier, with Covilhã and Sporting B.

Club career 
Born in Saint-Étienne, Aouacheria began his career at hometown club AS Saint-Étienne, where he represented the reserve team in the fourth and fifth tiers. In 2014, he moved to S.C. Covilhã of Portugal's Segunda Liga. He was loaned to Sporting CP B in the same league in August 2016.

In August 2017, Aouacheria signed a three-year deal with Moreirense F.C. in the Primeira Liga. The following 4 March, he scored his first top-flight goal to conclude a 2–0 home win over F.C. Paços de Ferreira.

Free agent Aouacheria signed a two-year deal at S.C. Farense in October 2020. Near the end of a season that ended in relegation, he was sent off for the first time in his career, in the first half hour of a 5–1 loss at FC Porto for a foul on Wilson Manafá.

In June 2021, Aouacheria moved to Gil Vicente F.C. again for two seasons.

References

External links
Bilel Aouacheria at Soccerway
Bilel Aouacheria at ForaDeJogo

1994 births
Footballers from Saint-Étienne
Living people
Association football forwards
French footballers
Championnat National 2 players
Championnat National 3 players
Primeira Liga players
Liga Portugal 2 players
S.C. Covilhã players
Sporting CP B players
Moreirense F.C. players
S.C. Farense players
Gil Vicente F.C. players
French expatriate footballers
Expatriate footballers in Portugal
French expatriate sportspeople in Portugal